ι Lupi, Latinised as Iota Lupi, is a solitary star in the southern constellation of Lupus. It is visible to the naked eye with an apparent visual magnitude of 3.54. Based upon an annual parallax shift of 9.65 mas as seen from Earth, it is located around 338 light years from the Sun. At that distance, the visual magnitude of the star is diminished by an extinction factor of 0.23 due to interstellar dust. It appears to be a member of the Scorpio-Centaurus OB association.

This star has the spectrum of a B-type subgiant star with a stellar classification of B2.5 IV, which may indicate that it has used up its core supply of hydrogen and has begun to expand off the main-sequence. It is rotating rapidly with a projected rotational velocity of 370 km/s. This is giving the star an oblate shape with an equatorial bulge that is an estimated 12% larger than the polar radius. It is about 20 million years old with 6.9 times the mass of the Sun and 4 times the Sun's radius. The star radiates 2,082 times the solar luminosity from its outer atmosphere at an effective temperature of 18,605 K.

References

External links

B-type subgiants
Lupus (constellation)
Lupi, Iota
Durchmusterung objects
125238
069996
5354